Harald Hofmann (born 18 July 1973) is an Austrian rower. He competed in the men's lightweight coxless four event at the 1996 Summer Olympics.

References

External links
 

1973 births
Living people
Austrian male rowers
Olympic rowers of Austria
Rowers at the 1996 Summer Olympics
Rowers from Linz